Kanpai! (乾杯 (かんぱい), or Kampai, is a common toast in the Japanese language. It may also refer to:

Music
 , a 1980 album by Tsuyoshi Nagabuchi
 , a 1980 song by Tsuyoshi Nagabuchi
 , a 1985 song by Rumiko Koyanagi
 "Kanpai", a 1975 single by Jun Mayuzumi
 "Kanpai", a single by Jerry Fujio

Other
 Campae or Kampai, a town in ancient Cappadocia
 Kanpai! (manga), a Japanese manga
 Kampai, another name for the bean Parkia speciosa
 Kampai I and Kampai II, villages in Lithuania